Laura Schaefer may refer to:
Laura A. Schaefer, American mechanical engineer
Laura K. Schaefer, American planetary scientist